Lwazi Ncedo Mvovo is a South African professional rugby union player for the  in Super Rugby and in the Currie Cup and the  in the Rugby Challenge. He was schooled at Maria Louw High School. His debut for the Sharks was on 27 June 2008 against Boland in Durban.

In the 2010 Currie Cup tournament Lwazi Mvovo was the second highest try scorer with twelve tries. In the Super Rugby competition, he tied for the second highest try scorer, with six.

In October 2010, Mvovo was selected to the South African squad of 39 players to prepare for the November tour of Europe. He made his Springboks debut on 20 November 2010 in the 21-17 loss to Scotland at Murrayfield. Mvovo scored his first international try against England, at Twickenham on Saturday 27 November 2010, in a 21-11 victory.

Mvovo made his Tri Nations debut in a 39-20 defeat against the Australia in Sydney on 23 July 2011. 
He then appeared against New Zealand in Wellington as number 11. He retired on the 4th of February 2021 at the age of 34.

References

External links
Lwazi Mvovo at Sharks

Lwazi Mvovo on Grundlingh Enslin's Springbok Rugby Hall of Fame
Lwazi Mvovo on itsrugby.co.uk
Zimbio

1986 births
Living people
People from Mthatha
Xhosa people
South Africa international rugby union players
South African rugby union players
Sharks (Currie Cup) players
Sharks (rugby union) players
Rugby union wings
Yokohama Canon Eagles players
Rugby union players from the Eastern Cape